Kuntu Blankson (1955-2018) was a Ghanaian actor who was very popular for the roles he played on a popular Ghanaian TV series known as Akan Drama in the late 1990s.

Filmography
 Akan Drama

References

1955 births
2018 deaths
Ghanaian male television actors